Nepal competed at the 1984 Summer Olympics in Los Angeles, United States.

Results by event

Athletics
Men's 400 metres
Pushpa Raj Ojha
 Heat — 52.12 (→ did not advance)

Men's 800 metres
Jodha Gurung
 Heat — 1:56.72 (→ did not advance)

Men's Marathon
 Baikuntha Manandhar — 2:22:52 (→ 46th place)
 Arjun Pandit — 2:32:53 (→ 63rd place)
 Amira Prasad Yadal — 2:38:10 (→ 69th place)

References
Official Olympic Reports

Nations at the 1984 Summer Olympics
1984
1984 in Nepal